{{Infobox radio station
| logo             = 
| name             = CHRL-FM
| airdate          =
| frequency        = 99.5 MHz (FM)
| city             = Roberval, Quebec
| format           = Adult Contemporary
| owner            = Cogeco
| erp              = 50,000 watts
| branding         = Planète 99,5
| class            = B
| sister_stations  = CFGT-FM, CHVD-FM, CKXO-FM, CKYK-FM
| website          = www.roberval.planeteradio.ca
| affiliations     = 
| callsign_meaning = C H RobervaL 
}}CHRL-FM is a French-language Canadian radio station located in Roberval, Quebec.

Owned and operated by Cogeco following its 2018 acquisition of most of the stations formerly owned by RNC Media, it broadcasts on 99.5 MHz using a directional antenna with an average effective radiated power of 15,031 watts and a peak effective radiated power of 50,000 watts (class B).

The station has an adult contemporary music format branded as Planète 99,5'''.

CHRL was launched as an AM radio station, broadcasting on 910 kHz, in 1949. It received the authorization from the Canadian Radio-television and Telecommunications Commission in September 2001 to convert to its current FM frequency, and shut down the AM transmitter a few months later in 2002.

References

External links
 Planète 99,5
 
 

Hrl
Hrl
Hrl
Roberval, Quebec
Radio stations established in 1949
1949 establishments in Quebec
hrl